Snapp! is an Iranian vehicle for hire company, headquartered in Tehran that launched in February 2014. Users can request a ride via the iOS, Android, or web application, by indicating their location and destination. The price of the trip is set beforehand, to eliminate bargaining. Snapp! commissions drivers upon completing a background check, and showing a valid driver's license and insurance before hiring them.

Funding and Operations
The company launched in 2014 as Taxi Yaab and experienced rapid growth in the first three years.

In October 2016, the company received a $20 million investment in a Series A round led by MTN Group, a South African multinational corporation. According to a 2017 interview with Shahram Shahkar, the former CEO of the company, Snapp! employs more than 300,000 active drivers and more than 500 other personnel at that time. Snapp rebranded itself and changed its logo in 2019.

As of 2019, Snapp! in Tehran was larger than Uber in any city. As of December 2020, Snapp! had 85% of Iran's market share with operations in 34 cities. Via its 1.5 million drivers, it provided two million rides per day and is credited with a major shift in how Iranians use taxis.

Products
In order to evade sanctions and appear on the app store, Snapp! had to disguise itself as a music app.
Similar to other companies such as Uber, Lyft, Snapp! features other options including: Snapp Taxi, Snapp Bike (for motorcycles), Snapp Box (for parcels) and Snapp Club (a loyalty program).

Subsidiaries 
Initially, Iran Internet Group was supposedly the holding company behind Snapp!. IIG also held other companies such as Bamilo and ZoodFood. Later on, it renamed or shut down some of these services in favor of expanding Snapp! from a transportation-focused company to a more general tech company. Because of this, the ZoodFood service was renamed to Snapp! Food and the online retail store known as Bamilo was shut down and redirected to the Snapp! Market website.

Lawsuit 
Snapp! was sued by TAPSI in an anti trust lawsuit which was dismissed by council of competition.

See also
 Technology start-ups in Iran
 Transport in Iran
AloPeyk

References

External links

Transport companies established in 2014
Online retailers of Iran
Ridesharing companies